Anolis morazani is a species of lizard in the family Dactyloidae. The species is found in Honduras.

References

Anoles
Reptiles described in 2009
Endemic fauna of Honduras
Reptiles of Honduras